Mordellistena gianassoi is a beetle in the genus Mordellistena of the family Mordellidae. It was described in 1991 by Horak.

References

gianassoi
Beetles described in 1991